Aeronautical Development Establishment is a laboratory of India's Defence Research and Development Organisation. Located in Bangalore, its primary function is research and development in the field of military aviation.

Recent successful projects include Lakshya (an aerial target), Nishant (a reconnaissance unmanned aerial vehicle), Nirbhay(a subsonic cruise missile), flight simulators for (LCA, Ajit, Kiran, Mig-21) and avionics packages for Tejas-LCA (display and FCC). It earlier worked on Sparrow (mini-uav) and Ulka (aerial target).

Shri Y Dilip, Outstanding Scientist is Director of Aeronautical Development Establishment since 01st January 2022.

History
Aeronautical Development Establishment (ADE) was established in January 1959 at High Grounds, Bangalore.

Technology divisions

References

External links

Defence Research and Development Organisation laboratories
Research institutes in Bangalore
1959 establishments in Mysore State
Research institutes established in 1959